Samuel Greenfield Poyntz (4 March 1926 – 18 February 2017) was an Irish bishop and author in the last third of the 20th century.

He was born in Manitoba in Canada to the Revd James Poyntz and Catherine Greenfield. Poyntz was educated at  Portora Royal School, Enniskillen and Trinity College, Dublin and ordained in 1951. He began his career with curacies at St George’s Dublin and St Paul’s Dublin before becoming Rector of St Stephen’s, Dublin. From 1974 to 1978 he was Archdeacon of Dublin, when he became Bishop of Cork, Cloyne and Ross. In 1987 he was translated to be the Bishop of Connor, retiring in 1995.

Publications 
 The Evaluation of the Blessed Virgin Mary - 1953
 Journey Towards Union - 1975
 Our Church - Praying with Your Church Family - 1983
 A Tapestry of Beliefs - 1998
 Many for Earth and Heaven - 2002

References

 

Archdeacons of Dublin
20th-century Anglican bishops in Ireland
Bishops of Cork, Cloyne and Ross
Bishops of Down, Connor and Dromore
Bishops of Connor
People educated at Portora Royal School
Alumni of Trinity College Dublin
1926 births

2017 deaths